William Augustus Jones Jr. (February 24, 1934 – February 4, 2006) was an African-American Minister and Civil Rights leader.

Biography
Reverend Dr. William Augustus Jones Jr. was born in Louisville, Kentucky, to Mary Elisabeth Jones and William Augustus Jones Sr. His life was considered to began as a medical miracle. It was said that he was not expected to be born alive because of a traumatic childbirth. William A. Jones reflecting upon the story of his birth once said: "All of my days have been lived with the feeling that Divine Providence has upheld, sustained and directed my destiny."

Reverend Dr. William Augusus Jones Jr. graduated with honors in sociology from the University of Kentucky, though he could not play basketball because African Americans were barred from the team. He earned a Doctorate from Crozer Theological Seminary in Chester, Pennsylvania.  While studying at Crozer, Reverend Dr. William Jones Jr. worshipped at the Calvary Baptist Church and became known as one of the "Sons of Calvary" along with Reverend Dr. Martin Luther King Jr. and Reverend Dr. Samuel D. Proctor, who all went on to become well known preachers in the Black Church.  He enlisted in the United States Army in 1954 as a Private and was discharged in 1956 as a First Lieutenant.

As a young Minister, Reverend Dr. Jones Jr. was taught by The Reverend Dr. BG Crawley, who was his pioneer and known as "The Walking Encyclopedia" to Baptist Ministers across the nation. Dr.BG Crawley was a Judge and founder of Little Zion Baptist Church of Brooklyn, New York. He also was mentor to Reverend Dr. Gardner C. Taylor and Reverend Dr. Samuel Dewitt Proctor.

Reverend Dr. Jones joined Reverend Dr. Martin Luther King Jr. in 1961, splitting from conservative Baptist churches and forming the Progressive National Baptist Convention.  He was known for being an outspoken and prophetic critic. In the 1960s, Reverend Al Sharpton, a Pentecostal minister at the time, was introduced to Reverend Dr. Jones. F. D. Washington. Reverend Dr. Jones became a mentor to the Reverend Al. Sharpton, and eventually Reverend Sharpton became part of the Baptist denomination.

For 43 years, Reverend Dr. William Augustus Jr. served as Minister at Bethany Baptist, a 5,000-member church in the Bedford-Stuyvesant neighborhood of Brooklyn, and hosted a syndicated weekly radio program called Bethany Hour. The Bethany Hour was also broadcast weekly on the syndicated Family Radio program hosted by the late Harold Camping. In 1979, Reverend Dr. William Augustus Jones Jr. published a book entitled God in the Ghetto.

Reverend Dr. William Augustus Jones Jr. is interred at the Lexington Cemetery in Lexington, Kentucky.

See also
Jennifer Jones Austin - Daughter

References

Sources
The life and ministry of William Augustus Jones Jr. as recounted in part by Jones in his Spiritual Autobiography, 1972.

1934 births
2006 deaths
African-American activists
African-American Baptist ministers
Clergy of historically African-American Christian denominations
Crozer Theological Seminary alumni
Activists for African-American civil rights
Religious leaders from Louisville, Kentucky
University of Kentucky alumni
Baptists from Kentucky
21st-century African-American people
20th-century Baptist ministers from the United States